The Civilian Space eXploration Team, known as CSXT, is a team of around 30 civilians interested in private spaceflight.  The team was created by Ky Michaelson.  Having conducted multiple rocket launches in an attempt to establish altitude records, CSXT became the first entity to officially launch an amateur rocket into space on May 17 2004, with the successful launch of its GoFast rocket to 116 km (72 miles) altitude, an altitude verified by FAA analysis of the team's flight data.

Prior privately funded space launches were achieved by the Orbital Sciences Pegasus, and many amateur teams have made unverified claims of rocket flights exceeding the boundary of space.

History
The team was established in 1995 by a group of model rocket hobbyists interested in spaceflight.  The team is supported by corporate sponsorship.

Team Composition
Currently Ky Michaelson is the program director.  CSXT's program was subdivided into three teams:
 Rocket Design and Ground Support Equipment
 Avionics and Ground System Design
 Wind Weighting System Development

The D.R. Hero Rocket
The D.R. Hero rocket was launched in August 1995. It was dedicated to stuntman Dar Robinson, a late friend of Ky Michaelson. It was anticipated to reach . The actual launch height was not reported. This rocket failed in a large CATO (Catastrophe At Take Off) motor failure just above the ground.

The Joe Boxer Space Launcher
The name of the Rocket is attributed the largest contributing sponsor, Joe Boxer. It was anticipated to reach , however, the actual height obtained was only . The entire rocket was recovered after what was considered a successful flight.

Space Shot - 1997
It was the first two-stage rocket launched by CSXT, and was expected to reach . The rocket was a P 13,500 first stage as booster for a N motor upper stage. This would have been the largest high-performance two-stage flight in the history of hobby rocketry, beating by double the O 10,000 to M Kosdon flights. During the launch, an electronics failure prevented the ignition of the second stage, though the first stage successfully detached, and was recovered with a parachute.

Space Shot - 2000
After launch the rocket encountered problems at  where the wind sheared off the fin causing the rocket to break apart.

Space Shot - 2002
This rocket was launched on September 19, 2002.  It was launched at the Black Rock Desert in Nevada. The rocket was equipped with a solid propellant motor.  The motor was to accelerate the rocket to Mach 5.  The rocket was equipped with GPS receivers and antennas, video recording devices, and a series of flight monitoring devices.  Three seconds after the rocket launched the motor burned through the casing, causing the rocket to fail.

Space Shot 2004 "GoFast" Rocket

The rocket was launched on Monday, May 17, 2004. This rocket was the first amateur rocket to exceed , the official boundary of outer space. It was launched at the Black Rock Desert. The avionics were recovered by deployment of a parachute.

Space Shot 2014 "GoFast" Rocket
On July 14, 2014 the team repeated their accomplishment with a second successful space launch, which set new records for the highest and fastest amateur rocket ever launched.

See also 
Amateur rocketry
Private spaceflight
Copenhagen Suborbitals, another amateur spaceflight organization, which is developing a manned space program.
Sounding Rocket

References

External links
 High Altitude Amateur Rocket Records, HobbySpace.com (2004)
 Mystery Solved: Stratofox Recovers CSXT Booster, Stratofox Aerospace Tracking Team (2004)
 CSXT SpaceShot 2004 - First Amateur Launch to Space, Stratofox Aerospace Tracking Team (2004)
 Recollections of the CSXT Space Shot 2004 (5th anniversary page), Stratofox Aerospace Tracking Team (2009)
 , posted by Ky Michaelson
 , posted by Wayne Vaughan
 , posted by Derek Deville
 , posted by Ian Kluft
 The Rocketman, Ky Michaelson's website.
 , posted by Ky Michaelson

Rocketry
Private spaceflight
Amateur radio organizations
1995 establishments in the United States